Matjaž Schmidt (7 February 1948 – 29 September 2010) was a Slovene artist and illustrator, best known for his children's books illustrations and comic strips.

Schmidt was born in Ljubljana. After high school, he attended the Faculty of Architecture. In 1968, he transferred to the Academy of Fine Arts in Ljubljana, where he specialized in illustration. He was married to Jelka Godec Schmidt, who is also an illustrator. In 2009, he won the Levstik Award for lifetime achievement in illustration. He died in Ljubljana, Slovenia.

References 

Artists from Ljubljana
Slovenian illustrators
1948 births
2010 deaths
Levstik Award laureates
University of Ljubljana alumni